The Hung Shing Yeh Beach is a beach on Lamma Island, Hong Kong. It is the most popular beach on Lamma Island. The beach is equipped with toilets, showers and changing rooms. It is also protected by shark net. The beach overlooks the Lamma Power Station.

History
On 11 March 1979, about 100 Vietnamese refugees aboard the Skyluck freighter jumped ship and swam to Lamma Island. About half of them were picked up at sea by police, while the other half mainly landed at Hung Shing Yeh Beach. They were all captured by the police.

The beach building was completed by the Regional Council in 1997/1998. The new structure comprised changing rooms, toilets, a first aid room, a staff office, a catamaran store, a lifeguard lookout, and waste treatment facilities.

Features
 BBQ pits (9 nos.)
 Changing rooms
 Showers and toilets

Transportation
The beach can be reached by walking for about 30 minutes from the Yung Shue Wan Ferry Pier.

See also
 Beaches of Hong Kong
Lamma Island

References

External links

 Hung Shing Yeh Beach

Beaches of Hong Kong
Lamma Island